The 22637 / 22638 West Coast Superfast Express is a daily train connecting the city of Chennai, in Tamil Nadu, with the port city of Mangalore in Karnataka via Palakkad Junction. It is one of the trains connecting the Bay of Bengal and Arabian Sea and the oldest train. From August 1, 2021 22637 Chennai Central - Mangalore Central West Coast Superfast Express runs with new timings.

The name traces to the location of Mangalore which is on the west coast of India. It is one of the oldest trains and also provides a day-time connectivity to Coimbatore from Chennai.

The train shares its rake with the Mangalore Mail which also traverses the same route.

In 2014 Ministry of Indian Railways Announced the Service Type of West Coast Express as Superfast The Schedule and Train Number also Changed from 16627/16628-> 22637/22638.

History

Introduced in 1965 as a Express train sharing rakes with Mangalore Mail, It was later upgraded to Superfast Express train in June 2014.

Loco link and coach composition

When introduced, it ran with a WDM-2 from Erode Diesel Loco Shed for the whole journey. Later after 1990 when the route electrified till Erode, it used electric locomotive from Chennai to Erode and a diesel loco from Erode to Mangalore. After electrification till Mangalore was completed, it now uses WAP-4 / WAP-7 in its entire journey.

It has a total of 23 coaches excluding the locomotive. It has 1 HCPV or High Capacity Parcel Van, 2 Guard Vans (One at each end). 4 General Compartments (1 GS compartment illegally occupied by RMS), 11 Sleeper coaches, 4 AC Three Tier, 1 AC Two Tier. and an RMS. When it departs Mangalore Central as 22638 for the return journey to Chennai, the RMS or Rail Mail Service coach is put at the end of the train.

Station stops

Chennai to Mangalore
List of stops on the West Coast Express from Chennai to Mangalore.

Mangalore to Chennai

List of stops on the West Coast Express from Mangalore to Chennai.

References

Transport in Mangalore
Transport in Chennai
Express trains in India
Rail transport in Tamil Nadu
Rail transport in Kerala
Rail transport in Karnataka
Named passenger trains of India